Daniel Chiriță (born 24 March 1974) is a Romanian former professional footballer who played as a defender.

Personal life
His son, Alexandru, is also a football player. They played together at AFC Filipeștii de Pădure and CS Ștefănești.

Honours
Petrolul Ploiești
Cupa României: 1994–95

Rapid București
Divizia A: 1998–99
Cupa României: 2001–02
Supercupa României: 1999

Zenit Saint Petersburg
Russian Premier League Cup: 2003

References

External links
 
 

1974 births
Living people
Sportspeople from Ploiești
Romanian footballers
Association football defenders
Romania under-21 international footballers
Liga I players
Liga II players
FC Petrolul Ploiești players
FC U Craiova 1948 players
FC Rapid București players
FC Progresul București players
FC UTA Arad players
FC Astra Giurgiu players
Ukrainian Premier League players
FC Shakhtar Donetsk players
FC Metalist Kharkiv players
FC Stal Alchevsk players
Russian Premier League players
FC Zenit Saint Petersburg players
Romanian expatriate footballers
Romanian expatriate sportspeople in Russia
Expatriate footballers in Russia
Expatriate footballers in Ukraine
Romanian expatriate sportspeople in Ukraine